The rusty-spotted genet (Genetta maculata), also called panther genet and large-spotted genet, is a genet that is widely distributed in sub-Saharan Africa. It is considered common and therefore listed as Least Concern on the IUCN Red List.

Characteristics 
The rusty-spotted genet has short whitish grey to pale yellow coloured fur with dark spots and a continuous dark line across the back. The spots of the upper two dorsal rows are round or square, brown in the center and darker outside. Its feet are of the same colour as the fur.

Behaviour and ecology 
Research in southeastern Nigeria revealed that the rusty-spotted genet has an omnivorous diet. It feeds on rodents like giant pouched rats (Cricetomys), Nigerian shrew (Crocidura nigeriae), Temminck's mouse (Mus musculoides), Tullberg's soft-furred mouse (Praomys tulbergi), Peters's striped mouse (Hybomys univittatus), typical striped grass mouse (Lemniscomys striatus), red-eyed dove (Streptopelia semitorquata), common agama (Agama agama), Mabuya skinks, Myriapoda, spiders, Orthoptera and Coleoptera as well as eggs, fruits, berries and seeds.

Taxonomy
In 1830, John Edward Gray first described a rusty-spotted genet using the name Viverra maculata based on a zoological specimen that lived in the menagerie at the Tower of London.
In the 19th and 20th centuries, several taxonomists proposed the following species and subspecies for specimens obtained by natural history museums:

fieldiana Du Chaillu, 1860
aequatorialis Heuglin, 1866
erlangeri, gleimi,  schraderi, stuhlmanni, suahelica, zambesiana Matschie, 1902
matschiei Neumann, 1902
pumila Hollister, 1916
insularis Cabrera, 1921
rubiginosa zuluensis Roberts, 1924
soror Schwarz, 1929
rubiginosa albiventris Roberts, 1932
deorum Funaioli and Simonetta, 1960
pardina schoutedeni Crawford-Cabral, 1970

Genetta letabae (Thomas and Schwann, 1906), formerly considered a subspecies, is now thought to be a separate species.

References

rusty-spotted genet
Mammals of Sub-Saharan Africa
rusty-spotted genet
rusty-spotted genet